Events in the year 1893 in Norway.

Incumbents
Monarch – Oscar II
Prime Minister –

Events
 19 May – a quick clay slide in Verdal destroyed 105 farms and killed 116 people.
 The local newspaper Stavanger Aftenblad was established by Lars Oftedal.

Arts and literature
The Norwegian Authors' Union (Den norske Forfatterforening) is established.
Edvard Munch begins to paint The Scream.

Sport
27 February – Norwegian Skating Association (Norges Skøyteforbund) is founded.

Births

January to March
6 January – Olaf Bjerke, trade unionist and politician (died 1957)
16 January – Alfred Engelsen, gymnast and Olympic gold medallist (died 1966)
21 January – Tolv Aamland, politician (died 1983)
26 January – Sigurd Pedersen, politician (died 1968)
30 January – Ingolf Davidsen, gymnast and Olympic silver medallist (died 1946)
25 February – Arne Langset, politician (died 1971)
14 March – Torstein Kvamme, politician (died 1985)
22 March – Rasmus Sørnes, inventor, clockmaker and radio technician (died 1967)
23 March – Reidar Tønsberg, gymnast and Olympic silver medallist (died 1956)
27 March – Einar Jansen, historian, genealogist and archivist (died 1960)
27 March – Johan Sæterhaug, boxer (died 1968)
30 March – Elise Fliflet, politician (died 1991)

April to June
5 April – Frithjof Andersen, wrestler and Olympic bronze medallist (died 1975)
26 April – Ole Øisang, newspaper editor and politician (died 1963)
29 April – Birger Brandtzæg, merchant and owner of a fishing station (died 1971).
4 May – Aasmund Kulien, politician (died 1988)
6 May – Ludvik Buland, trade unionist (died 1945)
19 May – Gudolf Blakstad, architect (died 1985)
30 June – Birger Var, rower and Olympic bronze medallist (died 1970)

July to September
3 July – Ragnar Vik, sailor and Olympic gold medallist (died 1941)
4 July – Frede Castberg, jurist (died 1977)
10 July – Niels Larsen Bruun, naval officer (died 1970)
11 July – Tancred Ibsen, officer, pilot, film director and screenwriter (died 1978)
18 August – Gustav Natvig-Pedersen, politician (died 1965)
19 August – Rolf Palmstrøm, military officer. 
18 September – Reidar Rye Haugan, newspaper publisher in America (died 1972)

October to December
14 October – Sigurd Roll, diplomat and former sprinter (died 1944)
27 October – Reidar Dahl, jurist and sports official, president of the Football Association of Norway (died 1977).
7 November – Ivar Navelsaker, military officer (died 1966)
10 November – Karl Henry Karlsen, politician (died 1979)
18 November – Eivind Kristoffer Eriksen, politician (died 1949)
21 November – Torvald Haavardstad, politician (died 1965)
25 November – Hartvig Caspar Christie, politician (died 1959)
26 December – Halfdan Schjøtt, sailor and Olympic gold medallist (died 1974)
27 December – Asbjørn Solberg, politician (died 1977)

Full date unknown
Sigval Bergesen the Younger, shipping magnate and industrialist (died 1980)
Anton Johnson Brandt, veterinarian (died 1951)
Einar Frogner, politician and Minister (died 1955)
Hans Severin Jelstrup, astronomer (died 1964)
Mikkel Ødelien, soil researcher (died 1984)
Øystein Olsen Ravner, politician (died 1975)

Deaths
12 January – Diderik Iversen Tønseth, politician (born 1818)
12 October – Harald Nicolai Storm Wergeland, military officer, politician, Minister and mountaineer (born 1814)
21 October – Jacob Jørgen Kastrup Sømme, businessperson, consul and politician (born 1817)
19 December – Axel Winge, politician (born 1827)
23 December – Gunnar Berg, painter (born 1863)

Full date unknown
Ludvig Daae, politician (born 1829)
Carl Peter Parelius Essendrop, bishop, politician and Minister (born 1818)
Simon Karenius Høegh, bank treasurer, merchant and politician (born 1810)
Olaf Isaachsen, painter (born 1835)

See also

References